Eugène Bridoux (1888-1955) was a French general. He served as Secretary of State for War, later Secretary of State for Defence, under Vichy France during World War II.

Early life
Eugène Bridoux was born on 24 June 1888 in Doulon, now a suburb of Nantes, France. He graduated from the École spéciale militaire de Saint-Cyr.

Career
Bridoux served as Secretary of State for War from 1942 to 1943, and as Secretary of State for Defence from 1943 to 1944, under Prime Minister Pierre Laval during Vichy France. He fled to the Sigmaringen enclave in 1944, and he was arrested by the United States Army in 1945. He was jailed at the Val-de-Grâce, but he escaped in 1947, settling in Francoist Spain. He was sentenced to the death penalty in absentia and dégradation nationale on 18 December 1948.

Death
Bridoux died in 1955 in Madrid, Spain.

References

1888 births
1955 deaths
People from Loire-Atlantique
École Spéciale Militaire de Saint-Cyr alumni
French generals
People of Vichy France
French exiles
French politicians convicted of crimes
People sentenced to death in absentia